The Remington R4 is a firearms platform based on the AR-15/M16/M4/M4A1 series designed and manufactured by Remington Arms.

Design
In 2012, when the R4 was introduced, the platform was available in four variants:  the 7-inch R4-C, 11.5-inch R4-E, 14.5-inch R4 and 20-inch R4-M. In 2018, the platform changed to three variants: the R4 Patrol, R4 Operator, and R4 Enhanced.

In 2012, the Queensland Police Service placed an order for 420 R4 carbines at a cost of almost AUD$1 million to replace the Ruger Mini-14.

In 2013, Remington announced it had been awarded a US$47 million contract by the Armed Forces of the Philippines, for the Philippine Army and the Philippine Marine Corps, placing an order for over 40,000 R4 carbines. The Armed Forces of the Philippines later increased the order to 63,286 R4s which are designated as the R4A3 which is equivalent to the Colt M4 RO977 model and replaces early model M16s.

In March 2015, Remington announced that it would offer the R4 to the civilian market.

In July 2018, Remington announced that it had been awarded a US$28 million contract by the United States Army for 5.56mm carbines on behalf of key international allies.

Variants

R10
In 2019, Remington unveiled a modified version of the R4, intended to function as a battle rifle by firing the more powerful 7.62×51mm NATO cartridge.

Users

 : Used by the Queensland Police Service.
 : Used by the Iraqi Special Operations Forces
 : Used by the Philippine Army and the Philippine Marine Corps as its next standard-issue rifle.

See also

List of assault rifles
Remington R5 RGP

References

External links
Remington Defense R4

5.56 mm assault rifles
Rifles of the United States
ArmaLite AR-10 derivatives
Weapons and ammunition introduced in 2012